Sergiu Grossu (14 November 1920 in Cubolta – 25 July 2009 in Bucharest) was a Romanian writer and theologian.

Biography
Sergiu Grossu was born to Ion and Maria Grossu on 14 November 1920 in Cubolta. In 1927, his family moved to Bălţi, where he was a classmate of Eugen Coşeriu. He published in Viaţa Basarabiei.  He graduated from the University of Bucharest with degrees in theology, philosophy and modern philology. Following the Soviet occupation of Bessarabia and Northern Bukovina, he became a refugee in Bucharest.  In the wake of the Soviet occupation of Romania, he joined Oastea Domnului (the Lord's Army), a spiritual renewal movement of lay volunteers as well as clerics, associated with the Romanian Orthodox Church. The organization was outlawed during the communist rule; his pseudonym was Simion Cubolta.

In April 1957, he married Nicoleta Valeria Bruteanu (1919–96), a graduate of Bucharest Conservatory, relative of Iuliu Maniu and former political detainee. The Romanian movie Binecuvântată fii, închisoare (Bless you, prison) and the book Prisoner Rejoice recount the story of Nicoleta Valeria Bruteanu's grueling years of detention by the Romanian Communist Regime.  On 7 March 1959 Grossu was arrested and sentenced to 12 years in prison for his activity in Oastea Domnului.  He was pardoned in 1962.  The communist dictatorship then denied him all but manual employment.

Sergiu Grossu and his wife migrated to France in 1969. There they founded the "Catacombes" publishing house, the association "La Chaine" and served as editors of the monthly magazine Catacombes (1971–92). He hosted the radio show "Lumea creştină" on Radio Free Europe, and lectured in Paris, Bordeaux, Versailles, Besançon, Dieppe, Tours, Blois, Poitiers, Nantes, Brest, Toulouse, Lyon &c.

On 18 January 1996, after 27 years in exile, Sergiu Grossu returned for good to Bucharest, bringing with him the mortal remains of his wife. In Bucharest, he founded Fundaţia Foştilor Deţinuţi Politici "Nicoleta Valeria Grossu", the publishing house "Duh şi Adevăr", and the association "Centrul de cultură creştină Nicoleta Valeria Grossu."

In Chişinău Sergiu Grossu founded Centrul internaţional de cultură pentru copii şi tineret "Sergiu Grossu" and sponsored the creation of the Muzeul Memoriei Neamului, led by his former classmate Vadim Pirogan.

Honours
 Premiul concursului de creaţie literar-creştin "Sergiu Grossu"
 Centrul internaţional de cultură pentru copii şi tineret "Sergiu Grossu"

Works
 .
 Lanțul, poems, 1971
 O rază de soare, poems, 1971
 Pietre de aducere aminte, poems, 1971
 La Chaine – 1971 Paris
 Un rayon de soleil – 1971 Paris
 ziarul "Catacombes"- 1971, editat timp de 20 de ani
 Catacombes 1973 (Almanach de l'Église de Silence), 1973, Éditions Catacombes
 Câmpurile de muncă în URSS, 1975
 Derrière le rideau de bambou (de Mao Tsé-toung à Fidel Castro), 1975, Éditions Catacombes, Paris
 La Technique du regard în Promesses - Revue de réflexions bibliques, N°15, Jul–Sep 1975
 The Church in today's catacombs, Arlington House, USA, 1976
 .
 Infernul chinez, 1976
 Au fond de l'abîme (Le règne de la haine), 1976, Éditions Apostolat des Éditions, Paris
 Les Enfants du Goulag (Chronique de l'enfance opprimé en URSS), 1979, France-Empire, Paris.
 
 .
 .
 Inscripţii pe un vas de lut – 1994, ed. Roza vвnturilor
 In şfichiul ironiei – 1996, ed. Hrisova, Bucuresti
 In aşteptarea unui pămвnt nou – 1998, ed. Duh şi Adevăr
 Îmi bate inima la Bug, ed. Museum, Chișinău, 2000
 Apocalipsiada
 .
 Plaidoyer pour L'Église du Silence, Ed. Resiac, 2003
 Calendarul persecuției religioase în țările comuniste, 2003

References

Bibliography 
 Sergiu Grossu, Calvarul României creștine, "Convorbiri Literare" - ABC DAVA, 1992.

External links 
  Sergiu Grosu, La Technique du regard
  Sergiu Grosu, La technique du regard (2)
 Sergiu Grossu
 Biografía Sergiu Grossu ( pseudonim Simion Cubolta)
  Literatura şi Arta, Un apostol al Neamului Romвnesc

1920 births
2009 deaths
People from Briceni District
Eastern Orthodox Christians from Romania
Radio Free Europe/Radio Liberty people
University of Bucharest alumni
Romanian theologians
Romanian journalists
Romanian writers
Moldovan writers
Moldovan male writers
Romanian essayists
Romanian textbook writers
Romanian dissidents
Romanian emigrants to France
20th-century essayists
20th-century journalists